Andrew Jackson Poe (1851–1920) was an American artist of the little-known folk art subset known as almshouse or poorhouse painters.

Early years
Andrew Jackson Poe was born on March 2, 1851, in Columbiana County, Ohio.  He was the sixth of eleven children born to Adam Poe and Lucy Todd Poe.  Andrew and seven of his siblings survived to adulthood.  The Poe family lived and worked on a farm in Beaver County, Pennsylvania.

Famed ancestors
Andrew Jackson Poe's great-great-grandfather was named George Jacob Pfau and his wife Catharine.  Pfau was of German extraction and his sons were the first to Anglicize their surname to Poe.  Pfau's sons Adam and Andrew were famed for their skirmishes with Native Americans in southern Beaver County.  Both men were known as fearless fighters, and the first Andrew Poe is reputed to have slain the Wyandot Indian Chief Bigfoot in 1781.  The brothers’ exploits were detailed in volume II of Theodore Roosevelt’s book, The Winning of the West from the Alleghenies to the Mississippi, 1777 - 1783. Poe is a second cousin of the West Point graduate and general Orlando Metcalfe Poe.

Adulthood
Poe was not known to have married or had children.  He traveled fairly extensively, paying for food and lodgings with his paintings.  From 1892 to 1893, he lived in St. Louis, Missouri.  Family lore held that his decorative painting adorns portions of the Union Station in St. Louis.

Little is known of his adult life other than the fact that around the turn of the century, when he was in his early 50s, he entered the Beaver County Home, a poorhouse for the destitute, alcoholics and other indigents.  There he  was befriended by the home's administrator, John Wesley Nippert.  Nippert used his own money to buy Poe paints, canvases and other art supplies.  By or upon Poe's death on November 11, 1911, about forty Poe paintings, mostly oils, were in Nippert's possession.

Artistic endeavors

Although Poe painted the occasional still life, his primary focus was on landscapes.  His work usually depicted scenes of Beaver County, Pennsylvania, and the adjoining Columbiana County, Ohio.  He occasionally noted his artistic debt to other, better-known painters by signing his own name and date in addition to the name of the artist he was copying.  Several of his pieces bear the names of German-born western Pennsylvania artist Emil Bott and H. Fisher, who may have been either calendar artist Hugh Fisher or his son, famed illustrator Harrison Fisher.  All of his existing pieces are dated between 1905 and 1907.

Death
Poe died November 11, 1920, in Beaver County, probably at the Beaver County Home.  He is buried in the Georgetown, Pennsylvania, cemetery.

References
Roosevelt, Theodore. The Winning of the West from the Alleghenies to the Mississippi, 1777 - 1783, volume II, 6. ISO-8859-1.
Vodrey III, William H. Andrew Jackson Poe: Artist, 1971.  OCLC #ocm29010094.

19th-century American painters
American male painters
20th-century American painters
People from Columbiana County, Ohio
1851 births
1920 deaths
People from Beaver County, Pennsylvania
19th-century American male artists
20th-century American male artists